Doris de Pont  (born 1954) is a New Zealand fashion designer and director of the New Zealand Fashion Museum.

Early life and education

Doris de Pont was born in Auckland, New Zealand in 1954. Her parents emigrated to New Zealand around 1952 from the Netherlands. Her maternal grandfather was a tailor and owned the family clothing business: established in 1840. Her father's family made football boots and shoes. Both family businesses contributed to the textile industry in Tilburg. de Pont started sewing at a young age and continued to sew while studying for a Bachelor of Arts in anthropology and political studies at the University of Auckland and completed her teacher training in the early-1970s.

Career

After her studies, de Pont worked as a teacher for several years before moving to the Netherlands, where she lived between 1978 and 1984. During this time she found work at the Rudolf Steiner School in The Hague, and also designed and made clothing as part of a women's fashion collective.

After returning to New Zealand, de Pont met Jack and Trelise Cooper at a night class for pattern making at Auckland Institute of Technology. It was through this connection that de Pont acquired the lease for her first boutique situated at 13 O'Connell Street, Auckland. The shop opened in June 1985 and sold her designs under the label 'Design: Doris de Pont'. In 1994 she joined up with textile designer Adrienne Foote to establish the fashion label DNA which was sold in New Zealand, Australia, the UK and Denmark. In 2002 de Pont and Foote parted ways and the DNA label became 'Doris de Pont'. de Pont was known particularly for her designs that incorporated the imagery of New Zealand artists including Richard Killeen and John Pule, and the New Zealand writer Gregory O'Brien. Items by de Pont are held in the collections of the Auckland War Memorial Museum, Te Papa and the National Gallery of Victoria.

Retiring from fashion in 2008, de Pont undertook a BA (Honours) in Museum and Heritage Studies at the University of Auckland, and after graduating founded the New Zealand Fashion Museum where she is the director and curates exhibitions.

Publications

As a curator and fashion historian, de Pont is the author or editor of a number of publications and catalogues, including:

 Looking terrific : the story of El Jay, Auckland: Centre for New Zealand Art, Research and Discovery (University of Auckland) and the New Zealand Fashion Museum, 2010. 
 Black : the history of black in fashion, society and culture in New Zealand, Auckland: Penguin Books, 2012.  
 Strands : weaving a new fabric, Auckland: Objectspace, 2015. 
 Walk the walk : A history of fashion in the city, Auckland: New Zealand Fashion Museum, 2017.

Awards and recognition

In 1990, Doris won the Hugh Wright Menswear Award at the Benson & Hedges Fashion Design Awards.

In 2013, de Pont was invested as an Officer of the New Zealand Order of Merit for services to fashion.

In 2019 de Pont was awarded a Museum Medal as a Companion of Auckland War Memorial Museum in recognition of her achievements to the public service of Auckland Museum

References

External links 
 Interview with Doris du Pont on the Art Ache podcast

1954 births
Living people
University of Auckland alumni
Officers of the New Zealand Order of Merit
People from Auckland
New Zealand fashion designers
New Zealand women fashion designers
New Zealand people of Dutch descent
New Zealand curators
New Zealand women curators